Quien Contra Mí (English: Who's Against Me?) is the debut album by Puerto Rican reggaeton singer-songwriter Yandel released physically on September 15, 2003, through Fresh Production, and released Worldwide on January 13, 2004, through Lideres Entertainment Group. The album was re-released on January 30, 2007, through Machete Music an urban music label owned by Universal. Three songs from the album were released as singles with their respective music video; "Te Suelto El Pelo", "Ya Yo Me Cansé" and "Say Ho!", they were included on the Bonus CD Edition from the album. Despite the songs "Mami Yo Quisiera Quedarme" featuring Alexis and "En La Disco Me Conoció" featuring Fido, weren't released officially as singles, both were featured at the end of the video of "Te Suelto El Pelo".

A sequel to the album, Quien Contra Mí 2, was released on July 31, 2020.

Track listing

Chart performance

Charts

Re-release

Release history

References

2003 debut albums
Yandel albums
Spanish-language albums
Albums produced by Luny Tunes
Machete Music albums